Anselmo de la Cruz y Bahamonde (baptized April 19, 1764; died July 23, 1833) was a Chilean political figure. He served several times as minister and participated actively in the war of independence in that country.

De la Cruz was born in Talca. A member of a royalist family, he was an active participant in the Chilean War of Independence. During the administration of Bernardo O'Higgins he was Minister of Finance twice, first in 1818 and then again in 1818–1820.  He died in Santiago on July 23, 1833.

References 

1764 births
1833 deaths
Chilean Ministers of Finance
People of the Chilean War of Independence
People from Talca
Cruz Family